Bierce is a surname. Notable people with the surname include:

Ambrose Bierce (1842 – ), American Civil War soldier, wit and writer
Lucius V. Bierce (1801–1876), attorney, five term mayor of Akron, Ohio, Commander-in-chief of the Patriot Army of the West during the Canada Patriot War of 1837-1839 
Sarah Elizabeth Bierce, 19th-century American journalist and educator
Scotty Bierce (1896–1982), American football player